The 2022 Cork Premier Intermediate Hurling Championship was the 19th staging of the Cork Premier Intermediate Hurling Championship since its establishment by the Cork County Board in 2004. The draw for the group stage placings took place on 8 February 2022. The championship ran from 29 July and 22 October 2022.

The final replay was played on 22 October 2022 at Páirc Uí Chaoimh in Cork, between Inniscarra and Castlemartyr, in what was their first ever meeting in the final. Inniscarra won the match by 3-12 to 1-17 to claim their first ever championship title.

Castlemartyr's Mike Kelly was the championship's top scorer with 1-64.

Team changes

To Championship

Relegated from the Cork Senior A Hurling Championship
 Bandon

Promoted from the Cork Intermediate A Hurling Championship
 Castlemartyr

From Championship

Promoted to the Cork Senior A Hurling Championship
 Courcey Rovers

Relegated to the Cork Intermediate A Hurling Championship
 Aghada

Group A

Group A table

Group A results

Group B

Group B table

Group B results

Group C

Group C table

Group C results

Knockout stage

Bracket

Relegation playoff

Quarter-finals

Semi-finals

Final

Championship statistics

Top scorers

Overall

In a single game

References

External links
 Cork GAA website

Cork Premier Intermediate Hurling Championship
Cork Premier Intermediate Hurling Championship